The siege of Beirut was an event in the aftermath of the First Crusade. The coastal city of Beirut was captured from the Fatimids by the forces of Baldwin I of Jerusalem on 13May 1110, with the assistance of Bertrand of Toulouse and a Genoese fleet.

Background
By 1101, the Crusaders had controlled the southern ports including Jaffa, Haifa, Arsuf and Caesarea, hence they managed to cut off the northern ports including Beirut from Fatimid support by land. In addition, the Fatimids had to disperse their forces including 2,000 soldiers and 20 ships in each of the remaining ports, until the main support could arrive from Egypt. Beginning on 15 February 1102, the Crusaders began harassing Beirut, until the Fatimid army arrived in early May.

In late autumn 1102, ships carrying Christian pilgrims to the Holy Land were forced by storm to land in the vicinity of Ascalon, Sidon and Tyre. The pilgrims were either slain or taken as slaves to Egypt. Hence, controlling the ports became urgent for the safety of pilgrims, in addition to the arrival of men and supply from Europe.

Siege
By February 1110, the Genoese and Pisan ships started to blockade the harbour, Fatimid ships from Tyre and Sidon tried in vain to break the blockade. In the meantime, the Beirut's defenders destroyed one siege tower, but the attackers managed to build another two to storm the walls.

Jacques de Vitry, a historian of the Crusades, reported:

Moreover, William of Tyre wrote that Baldwin and Bertrand ordered galleys from the nearby controlled ports to blockade Beirut, while constructing all siege towers, ladders, bridges and catapults from the pine trees in the neighborhood. The defenders had to defend the walls with no rest by day and by night for two months, until some crusaders managed to leap over the walls to open the gates for the attackers. With the gates being open, the inhabitants escaped to the port, yet the blockade forced them to retreat, hence they became trapped between two enemies.

However, the Fatimid governor fled by night through the Italian fleet to Cyprus. On 13 May 1110, Baldwin captured the city by assault after a seventy-five-day siege. The Italians conducted a massacre among the inhabitants, in which 20,000 Arabs might have been possibly killed by the attackers in Beirut.

Aftermath
After the fall of Beirut, Baldwin celebrated Pentecost in Jerusalem, then he hurried along with Bertrand to the County of Edessa to fight against Mawdud's invasion. By the end of the year, Baldwin captured Sidon with assistance from Sigurd I of Norway.

References

Sources
 
 
 
  
 
 
  
 

Beirut
Beirut
History of Beirut
1110s in the Kingdom of Jerusalem
Beirut
1110 in Asia